Elvismar Rodríguez Ruiz is a judoka from Venezuela. She represented her country in the 2016 Summer Olympics in the Women's 70 kg competition, but lost to Antónia Moreira of Angola in the first round via ippon. She also competed in the women's 70 kg event at the 2020 Summer Olympics in Tokyo, Japan.

In 2020, she won one of the bronze medals in the women's 70 kg event at the 2020 Pan American Judo Championships held in Guadalajara, Mexico.

References

External links
 
 

Judoka at the 2016 Summer Olympics
Olympic judoka of Venezuela
Living people
Venezuelan female judoka
1997 births
Judoka at the 2014 Summer Youth Olympics
Judoka at the 2019 Pan American Games
Pan American Games medalists in judo
Pan American Games gold medalists for Venezuela
Medalists at the 2019 Pan American Games
Judoka at the 2020 Summer Olympics
Judoka at the 2015 Pan American Games
People from Ciudad Guayana
21st-century Venezuelan women